Sonnat-e Olya (also Romanized as Sonnat-e ‘Olyā; also known as Sonnat, and Sonnat-e Bālā) is a village in Sokmanabad Rural District, Safayyeh District, Khoy County, West Azerbaijan Province, Iran. At the 2006 census, its population was 50, in 6 families.

References 

Populated places in Khoy County